Naranathu Thampuran is a 2001 Indian Malayalam-language film directed by Viji Thampi. It was one of the hits of Jayaram and ran more than 75 days in most of the centres. This was Jayaram's third release in 2001 after Vakkalath Narayanan Kutty and Sharjah to Sharjah.

Cast
Jayaram as Ananthan Varma
Kausalya as Hemalatha
Rajan P. Dev as Ananthan's Uncle
Siddique as Dr. Rajeev
Poornima Indrajith as Sridevi
Janardhanan as Police officer Chandradas
Maniyanpilla Raju as Mohandas
Jagannatha Varma as Hemalatha's Father
Harisree Ashokan as Sadan
Ponnamma Babu as Nirmala
Salim Kumar as Shivan
Bindu Panicker as Premavathi
 Manka Mahesh as Saradha
Baburaj as Vikraman
Nandhu as Snake Trainer
Poojapura Ravi as Thamarakshan
Augustine as Somanathan
T.P Madhavan as Nambiyar
Kanakalatha as Sulochana
Kozhikode Narayanan Nair as Kunjiraman Nair
Kochu Preman as Peethambaran
Manu Varma as Kumar
Shivaji as Chakochan

References

2001 films
2000s Malayalam-language films
Cross-dressing in Indian films
Films directed by Viji Thampi